Ramalina hyrcana is a species of lichen in the family Ramalinaceae. Known from Iran, it was described as new to science in 2011.

References

Lichens of Western Asia
Lichen species
Lichens described in 2011
hyrcana
Taxa named by Harrie Sipman